The Church of St. John the Evangelist and St. Peter is a Grade II listed Church of England church of Ladywood, Birmingham, England.

History
The Church of St. John the Evangelist was built to designs by the architect Samuel Sanders Teulon between 1852 and 1854. It was founded as a mission from St Martin in the Bull Ring and the rector of St. Martin’s was patron of the living.

The governors of the King Edward VI Schools had also agreed to allow a site on their property. The site was on what was then known as Ladywood Green, a 17th-century Great Plague burial ground. Frederick Gough, 4th Baron Calthorpe laid the foundation stone on 28 September 1852, and the church was consecrated by Henry Pepys, the Bishop of Worcester, on 15 March 1854. The cost of the building was £6,000 (equivalent to ).  It was a commissioners' church as a grant of £247 was given towards its cost by the Church Building Society.

In 1876 part of the parish was taken to form the new parish of St Margaret’s Church, Ladywood.

In 1881, a further sum of £2,350, was expended in the erection of a new chancel and other additions by the architect J. A. Chatwin.

The church was significantly redeveloped and restored internally between 1994 and 2005, (a flagship to internal church redevelopment) which now enables the building to have a light, airy, flexible worship space.  The building benefits from good acoustics. Many different organisations use this building and it plays host to numerous concerts and other events throughout the year. It is a church that is very much alive and serving the local community and beyond. Following the closure of St Peter's Church, Spring Hill in 2001 the parish is now known as St John and St Peter's, Ladywood.

Clergy
 Francis Morse 1854-1865
 Richard J. Mooyaart 1864-1868
 John Leech Porter 1868-1888
 A. R. Runnels-Moss 1888-1921
 J. L. Porter 1921-1927
 Canon Parslew 1927-1940
 Norman Darrall 1940-1952
 Norman Power 1952-1988
 Richard Tetlow 1989-2008
 Ian Harper 2010–present

Organ
The church had an organ by Bevington installed in 1858 which was modified in 1888. A specification of this organ can be found on the National Pipe Organ Register.

This organ was replaced by a Hammond organ in 1939 which was subsequently upgraded.

A two manual, 33 stop Renaissance Quantum digital organ by Allen was installed in 2008.

List of organists
 Alfred R. Gaul 1859-1868
 Samuel Simms ????-1879 (afterwards organist of St. Cyprian's Church, Hay Mills)
 Mark James Monk 1879–1880 (later organist of Truro Cathedral)
 Thomas Troman 1880–1881
 Henry Taylor 1881–1903
 Samuel Simms (son of earlier Samuel Simms) (previously organist of St. Cyprian's Church, Hay Mills)
 W. E. Robinson 1907-????

Directors of music
 Ian Biggs, M Mus, FNMSM, ARCO 2011–2013 (previously assistant organist at St Mary's Church Moseley)

St. Peter’s Church, Spring Hill
St Peter’s, Spring Hill built in 1901 ceased to function as an Anglican church in 2001 and was combined with St John’s to make one new, larger parish.

References

Grade II listed buildings in Birmingham
Grade II listed churches in the West Midlands (county)
Churches completed in 1854
19th-century Church of England church buildings
Church of England church buildings in Birmingham, West Midlands
Commissioners' church buildings
Samuel Sanders Teulon buildings
1854 establishments in England